Capitol City Baptist Church (CCBC) is a Baptist church located at 111 West Avenue, Quezon City, Philippines. It is one of two baptist churches found along West Avenue, the other being Faith Baptist Church. In 2009, the church made history as it reached 50 years of existence.

Organization

Faith and Purpose 
CCBC believes in the Bible as the ultimate source for all its teachings and practices. Specifically, the church believes in the trinity, and that Jesus died for the sins of man so that all who place their faith in him are saved from damnation. CCBC places very strong emphasis on evangelism as is evident in its mission and purpose statements; its mission statement is "In the heart of the nation, with the nations at heart," while its purpose statement is "Strategically Engaged in Nations’ Discipleship through Christ-centered Community Transformation Birthing and Building up Churches (SEND CCBC)."

Leadership
CCBC is led by the senior pastor, Dr. Reynaldo R. Avante, under the guidance of a church board headed by Jewellord P. Peralta. Consisting of not more than 15 members, the church board is composed of the senior pastor, two other pastors, and congregation members who are mostly recognized as elders as described in 1 Timothy 3 and Titus 1. The board has several duties such as providing spiritual leadership, drafting annual plans and budgets, and overseeing all church-related affairs. Bishop Fred M. Magbanua, Jr. is credited as the first Filipino pastor of CCBC.

Services and Attendance 
CCBC accommodates four Sunday worship services:

|-
| align = "center" colspan = 3 | CCBC Sunday Worship Services
|-
| align = "center" style="border-style: none none solid solid; background: #e3e3e3" | Service
| align = "center" style="border-style: none none solid solid; background: #e3e3e3" | Start Time (PHT)
| align = "center" style="border-style: none none solid solid; background: #e3e3e3" | End Time (PHT)
|-
| align = "left" | First Service
| align = "right" | 07:30
| align = "right" | 08:45
|-
| align = "left" | Second Service
| align = "right" | 09:15
| align = "right" | 10:30
|-
| align = "left" | Third Service
| align = "right" | 11:15
| align = "right" | 12:30
|-
| align = "left" | Fourth Service
| align = "right" | 18:00
| align = "right" | 19:15

The church performs the Holy Communion during the services of the first Sunday of every month.

The second service provides for a sign language interpretation for deaf attendees, who average around 100 in number per service.

In addition to the Sunday services, the church also holds a Wednesday service called the Midweek Encounter with God (MEG), which starts at 19:00 and ends at 20:30. As of 2012, attendance for this service averaged about 35 attendees per week.

Prior to 2012, the church employed the following schedule:

|-
| align = "center" colspan = 4 | CCBC Sunday Worship Services
|-
| align = "center" style="border-style: none none solid solid; background: #e3e3e3" | Service
| align = "center" style="border-style: none none solid solid; background: #e3e3e3" | Start Time (PHT)
| align = "center" style="border-style: none none solid solid; background: #e3e3e3" | End Time (PHT)
| align = "center" style="border-style: none none solid solid; background: #e3e3e3" | Average Number of Attendees
|-
| align = "left" | First Service
| align = "right" | 07:30
| align = "right" | 09:00
| align = "right" | 200
|-
| align = "left" | Second Service
| align = "right" | 10:30
| align = "right" | 12:00
| align = "right" | 500
|-
| align = "left" | Third Service
| align = "right" | 18:00
| align = "right" | 19:30
| align = "right" | 100

Since 2012, the church has opted not to disclose information about the number of attendees for its services.

Physical Structure

The auditorium has a floor area of about 400 square-meters. Two balconies (left and front, when facing the audience from the stage) exist, each with a seating capacity of close to 150 people. The main (ground) floor can  be occupied by around 400 people, yielding a total seating capacity of approximately 700 people for the whole auditorium.

Surrounding the auditorium are several rooms used for various meetings.

The church also houses an indoor parking lot covering an area of about 200 square-meters.

Expansion 
During the 50th anniversary celebration of the church, plans to construct a new building on the indoor parking lot were unveiled. In 2011, after two years of silence, discussions on the building expansion resumed. As a prelude to the work to be done, the Book of Nehemiah was covered in the sermons during the fourth quarter of 2011. Preliminary calculations estimate the total expansion cost to amount to ₱70 million.

In 2012, the estimated total cost was reduced to ₱25 million, and fund raising was initiated.

Finance 
Church operations are funded by the tithes and offerings collected during the worship services. As of 2009, a monthly target of 1.77 million Pesos was set to finance the organization's ministries, capital expenditures, staff wages, and various administrative costs. In 2012, this target was raised to 1.88 million Pesos.

In a statement released in July 2011, CCBC disclosed that from January to May 2011, it averaged a monthly income of about ₱1,200,000±200,000. Expenses averaged approximately the same amount of ₱1,200,000±100,000 for the period reported.

Affiliations 
CCBC is a member of the Conservative Baptist Association of the Philippines (CBAP). In 2011, Dr. Reynaldo Avante was elected as president of CBAP for a term of two years.

The church has been in partnership with Evangelism Explosion since the early 1990s.

Ministries and Missions

Evangelism

Philippines 
CCBC regularly conducts evangelism seminars to equip its members on the task of spreading the gospel. Among the trainings provided are evangelism explosion and Kairos courses.

In 2010, CCBC launched "24/7 Missions Prayer Chain," a ministry which aims to provide a continuous, round-the-clock prayer system for the salvation of unreached people groups around the world. In the system, each registered member is assigned a 30-minute slot during a designated time of the day of the week, to pray for specific groups of people.

CCBC has planted several local daughter churches, some of which include:
 CCBC Caloocan (Caloocan)
 CCBC Catarman (Catarman, Northern Samar)
 CCBC Arayat (Arayat, Pampanga)
 CCBC San Fernando (San Fernando, Pampanga)
 CCBC Dela Costa (Bulacan)
 Filinvest Community Christian Fellowship (Batasan Hills, Quezon City)
 Christ-Centered Bible Church Sauyo (Mindanao Ave., Quezon City)
 CCBC Balogo (Marinduque)
 CCBC Kansurok (Marinduque)
 CCBC Bonliw (Marinduque)

Hong Kong 
CCBC's evangelistic efforts reach out to Hong Kong to especially minister to the needs of Filipino women working as domestic helpers there. The overseas endeavor is spearheaded by Pastor Jorge De Ramos, and as of 2011, administers to the needs of over 100  overseas filipino workers through a ministry that has been called the Jubilee International Filipino Fellowship. The fellowship conducts its worship services at an auditorium located at the Pui Ching Academy, which is capable of seating a total of 400 attendees.

Cambodia 
CCBC partners with Ethnos Asia Ministries to conduct trainings in Cambodia. Trainings are designed to equip Cambodian church workers with methods on worship, Bible study, evangelism, teaching and medical assistance. In addition, CCBC members may be sent to this country for exposure trips with the purpose of acclimatizing prospective missionaries prior to actual engagement.

CoC's
Circle of Care (CoC) groups are cell groups where members engage in several activities which may include enjoying fellowship, conducting Bible studies, and praying together. Often composed of fewer than 10 members, a CoC group focuses on the personalized needs of its members through regular (usually weekly) meetings where members share, counsel and pray for their individual life concerns.

As of 2009, there are about 60 registered CoC groups. A group is often formed based on certain commonalities among its members. Such similarities may be rooted based on age, gender, residential proximity, occupation or artistic inclination.

All-Men Fellowship 
The all-men fellowship is composed of about 6 CoC's whose members are all of the male gender and of adult age. Members in this fellowship meet about once a month to establish and maintain friendships, worship as a group, and receive spiritual guidance for the direction of the corresponding CoC groups.

All-Women Fellowship

Golden Ladies Fellowship 
The Golden Ladies Fellowship is an alliance of church women who are at least 50 years of age. The group was founded in 1994.

Deaf Ministry

Children Ministry 
The children ministry, more popularly called “Kids@111” in reference to the address of CCBC, is a service that nurtures the children of the church ranging from 2 years to 12 years of age. Specifically, the ministry aims to impart the word of God to children so that they become knowledgeable in and obedient to the faith by the time they reach adolescence. The ministry further believes in the value of every child, recognizes the need to develop their talents, and envisions them as future leaders. To fulfill its mission and vision, the ministry engages in several activities aimed to develop children. Among these are Sunday school classes, vacation bible classes, arts and crafts, environmental awareness programs, and parent-child interactions.

At the start of 2011, the children ministry opened a Sunday school class that runs in parallel with the evening service. The class was set up in order to minister to children whose guardians can only attend the evening service, as well as to minimize distractions caused by children who misbehave during the evening service.

As of 2012, the children ministry was in active collaboration with the Sto. Cristo Elementary School.

Youth Ministry 
The Youth Ministry of CCBC, more popularly known as Youth@111 in reference to the address of the church, is a group that caters to the distinctive needs of teenagers. Directed by Pastor Randolph Velasquez and registered under the  National Youth Commission, the ministry helps primarily high school and college students face the transitional phase of adolescence.

In 2010, Youth@111 celebrated its first 10 years of existence.

As of 2012, the ministry was in active collaboration with the following schools:
 San Francisco High School
 Ernesto Rondon High School

San Francisco High School 
Youth@111 extends its ministry to the San Francisco High School due to the school's proximal distance from the church, and Pastor Randolph Velasquez's affiliation as a community volunteer worker in the school. CCBC workers and volunteers regularly conduct values education classes with the students of the school, often gathering students in the same class sections to common groups to foster openness and sharing in discussions.

Young Adults Ministry

Music Ministry
The music ministry caters to the musical needs of the church and is most prominent in its role of leading the congregational praise and worship portion of the worship service. The ministry uses mostly contemporary Christian music in performing its function, though occasionally traditional hymns are utilized. Songs are often in the English language although songs in Tagalog or other Filipino dialects are also employed.

Also referred to as the praise and worship ministry, the music group is regarded as one of the more physically demanding departments of the church, as members commit to extended hours of practices and performances without any monetary benefit.

Social Concern Ministry
The social concern ministry works on projects that mostly benefit individuals and groups that are beyond the confines and direct responsibility of the church. Some of the projects in 2010 involved blood donations, donations for children afflicted with cancer, and training on reaching out to individuals sick with HIV/AIDS.

Culture and Demographics

Languages 
Services are often conducted in the English language though Tagalog is also used albeit to a lesser degree. The first service, however, tends to utilize the Tagalog language more extensively. In addition, sign language interpretation is made available during the second service to minister to the needs of deaf attendees.

Literature 
The church publishes two weekly literature types that are distributed to attendees as they enter the auditorium during the Sunday services. The first type serves as a programme but is verbally referred to as the 'bulletin.' It contains a message from the senior pastor, and a financial report on the tithes and offerings received from the previous week's services. Moreover, the programme includes a listing of the church activities from the various ministries for the current Sunday as well as for the days ahead. Such activities are collectively referred to as 'Kingdom Opportunities,' and their publication in the bulletin is meant to attract participants or volunteers for the corresponding events.

In 2012, the bulletin was revised to include a discussion guide section for CoC groups. Prior to this change, this section was occupied by devotional material extracted from various sources.

The second type of literature is a weekly prayer guide and is entitled "Golden Bowls" in allusion to the prayer of the saints from the context of Revelations 5:8. The guide functions as a suggested prayer list which includes the praises and requests of church workers, members and attendees, and families. Furthermore, the literature also reports on the current statuses and aspirations of the different projects and ministries of the church.

December 
Similar to Philippine culture, CCBC usually conducts several parties one after the other during the month of December to celebrate the Christmas season. Parties are often separated according to the different fellowships and ministries of the church. Also during this month, the church practices an event called “Everybody’s Birthday,” whereby a big box is placed on stage to which congregation members place monetary offerings into. Members walk to the stage to drop their offerings as the month of their birthdates are called out, while the band repeatedly plays the song, “Happy Birthday to You", which is later modified to "Happy Birthday, Jesus." Donations received through this tradition are then used to fund the various activities of the church.

Misyon: Samba 
Once in a while, the church engages in a practice called "Misyon: Samba," which in English translates to "Mission: Worship." The practice features the use of relatively indigenous music in the worship service, and may be accompanied by a sermon that focuses on the importance of missions.

Families 
CCBC is not spared from national issues and trends that affect family health and relationships. For instance, though no formal studies have been conducted yet, it is generally acknowledged within the church that the rising number of parents who work as overseas Filipino workers (OFWs) places significant stress in the maintenance of relationships among members within families. Moreover, the growing number of parents who labor as call center agents also adds to the difficulty in raising families, as call center agents often have to work in night schedules thereby decreasing the amount of time of being with their respective families.

Marriages 
The church highly discourages its members from marrying unbelievers in strict adherence to the biblical teaching found in  2 Corinthians 6:14. In contrast, members are actually encouraged to marry each other, though the church has nothing against its members marrying fellow believers from other churches of the same creed.

Socioeconomic Differences 
As significant socioeconomic differences admittedly do exist within the church, members are strongly exhorted to transcend such barriers and unify as a group in fulfilling God's purposes. In 2011, members of the Golden Ladies Fellowship were commended for their ability to harmoniously relate with each other despite the substantial heterogeneity in social classes.

History

Founding

1960-1969 
Rev. Arthur R. Beals served as pastor from 1962 to 1965.

1970-1979

1980-1989

1986 
In July 1986, Pastor Cesar C. Castro of the Deaf Evangelistic Alliance Foundation (DEAF), Rina Dimaculangan, and CCBC Pastor Rev. Reynaldo I. Atienza established the Deaf Ministry.

1990-1999

1994 
The Golden Ladies Fellowship was founded during this year.

1997 
CCBC Caloocan was founded during this year.

2000-2009

2007 
Dr. Reynaldo R. Avante was endorsed by the board of trustees and affirmed by the congregation to serve as Senior Pastor.

2009 
On July 26, 2009, CCBC celebrated its 50th anniversary at the Henry Lee Iwrin Theater of the Ateneo de Manila University. During the event, commemorative plaques were awarded to pastors, missionaries and workers in recognition of their contributions to the church. The theme song "Ipahayag" was performed by Reynate Gungon and Nikka Mandap.

2010-2019

2010 
 The church covered each of the Beatitudes from the book of Matthew in its sermons from August to October.
 Throughout the month of November, the church celebrated the 10th anniversary of Youth@111 through a series of festive and thanksgiving events.
 In December, the church conducted an election for new board members who will serve for the years 2011 and 2012. CCBC also celebrated the Christmas season through five consecutive evening worship services similar to the Catholic's practice of “simbang gabi.”
 The 24/7 Missions Prayer Chain was initiated.

2011 
 At the start of 2011, the children ministry opened a Sunday school class that runs in parallel with the evening service.
 In May, Youth@111, in collaboration with Nur Factory, engaged in a peace camp held in Camp Capinpin in Rizal, with the aim of fostering better understanding and peace between Muslim and Christian children.
 During this year, after several months of evaluations and deliberations, Marcelo Abelado was commissioned to serve as associate pastor for the church.

References

External links
Official Website
 Facebook Website
 Multiply Website
 Deaf Ministry Website
 Youth Ministry Multiply Website
 Youth@111 Facebook Website (Login required)
 Young Adults Ministry Multiply Website
 Young Adults Ministry Facebook Website (Login required)

Christian organizations established in 1959
Baptist churches in the Philippines
20th-century Baptist churches
Churches in Quezon City
20th-century churches in the Philippines